The Men's 69 kg weightlifting competitions at the 2016 Summer Olympics in Rio de Janeiro took place on 9 August at the Pavilion 2 of Riocentro.

Schedule
All times are Time in Brazil (UTC-03:00)

Records
Prior to this competition, the existing world and Olympic records were as follows.

Results

1 Artykov originally won the bronze medal, but was disqualified after he tested positive for strychnine.

References

Weightlifting at the 2016 Summer Olympics
Men's events at the 2016 Summer Olympics